Elverum Station is a railway station located at Vestad, on the west side of Glomma of Elverum, Norway. The station is on the Røros Line, in addition to being the terminus of the Solør Line.

History
It was opened in 1862 as part of the Hamar–Grundset Line. The current station building was drawn by Paul Armin Due and constructed as part of the Solør Line in 1913. The station is no longer staffed.

The restaurant was taken over by Norsk Spisevognselskap on 24 November 1921. They retained operation until 8 May 1931, when it was transferred back to private operation.

References

Railway stations in Hedmark
Railway stations on the Røros Line
Railway stations on the Solør Line
Railway stations opened in 1862
1862 establishments in Norway
Elverum